Rosa Luxemburg is a 1986 West German drama film directed by Margarethe von Trotta. The film received the 1986 German Film Award for Best Feature Film (Bester Spielfilm), and Barbara Sukowa won the Cannes Film Festival's Best Actress Award and the German Film Award for Best Actress for her performance as Rosa Luxemburg.

Plot
Polish socialist and Marxist Rosa Luxemburg dreams about revolution during the era of German Wilhelminism. While Luxemburg campaigns relentlessly for her beliefs, getting repeatedly imprisoned in Germany as well as in Poland, she spars with lovers and comrades until Luxemburg is assassinated by Freikorps for her leadership in the Spartacist uprising after World War I in 1919.

Cast
 Barbara Sukowa as Rosa Luxemburg
 Daniel Olbrychski as Leo Jogiches
 Otto Sander as Karl Liebknecht
 Adelheid Arndt as Luise Kautsky
 Jürgen Holtz as Karl Kautsky
 Doris Schade as Clara Zetkin
 Hannes Jaenicke as Kostja Zetkin
 Jan Biczycki as August Bebel
 Karin Baal as Mathilde Jacob
 Winfried Glatzeder as Paul Levi
 Regina Lemnitz as Gertrud
 Barbara Lass as Rosa's mother
 Dayna Drozdek as Rosa, 6 years old
 Henryk Baranowski as Josef, Rosa's brother
 Patrizia Lazreg as Josef's daughter
 Charles Régnier as Jean Jaurès

Reception

References

External links
 

1986 films
1986 drama films
1980s German-language films
Anti-war films about World War I
1980s biographical drama films
German biographical drama films
West German films
Films set in Berlin
Films set in the 1890s
Films set in the 1900s
Films set in the 1910s
1980s historical drama films
German historical drama films
Films directed by Margarethe von Trotta
Biographical films about revolutionaries
Cultural depictions of Karl Liebknecht
Cultural depictions of Rosa Luxemburg
1980s German films